Buddha-nature refers to several related Mahayana Buddhist terms, including tathata ("suchness") but most notably tathāgatagarbha and buddhadhātu. Tathāgatagarbha means "the womb" or "embryo" (garbha) of the "thus-gone" (tathāgata), or "containing a tathāgata", while buddhadhātu literally means "Buddha-realm" or "Buddha-substrate".

Buddha-nature has a wide range of (sometimes conflicting) meanings in Indian and later East Asian and Tibetan Buddhist literature. Broadly speaking, the terms refer to the potential for all sentient beings to be a Buddha, since the luminous mind, "the natural and true state of the mind," the pure (visuddhi) mind undefiled by kleshas, is inherently present in every sentient being, and is eternal and unchanging. It will shine forth when it is cleansed of the defilements, c.q. when the nature of mind is recognised for what it is. 

The Mahāyāna Mahāparinirvāṇa Sūtra (written 2nd century CE), which was very influential in the Chinese reception of the Buddhist teachings, linked the concept of tathāgatagarbha with the buddhadhātu. The term buddhadhātu originally referred to relics. In the Mahāparinirvāṇa Sūtra, it came to be used in place of the concept of tathāgatagārbha, reshaping the worship of the physical relics of the Buddha into worship of the inner Buddha as a principle of salvation.

The primordial or undefiled mind, the tathagatagarbha, is also equated with sunyata; with the alaya-vijñana ("store-consciousness", a yogacara concept); and with the interpenetration of all dharmas. The Chinese Yogacara school came to regard buddha-nature as an eternal ground and the ultimate source and support of all phenomenal reality. The Chinese Madhyamaka based its understanding of emptiness on the Indian sources and not on Daoist concepts which previous Chinese Buddhists had used, and sought to remove all ontological connotations of the term as a metaphysical reality. It saw buddha nature as being synonymous with terms like "tathata," "dharmadhatu," "ekayana," "wisdom, '' "ultimate reality," "middle way" and also the wisdom that contemplates dependent origination.

Etymology

Tathāgatagarbha
The term tathāgatagarbha may mean "embryonic tathāgata", "womb of the tathāgata", or "containing a tathagata". Various meanings may all be brought into mind when the term tathagatagarbha is being used.

Compound
The Sanskrit term tathāgatagarbha is a compound of two terms, tathāgata and garbha:
 tathāgata means "the one thus gone", referring to the Buddha. It is composed of "tathā" and "āgata", "thus come", or "tathā" and "gata", "thus gone". The term refers to a Buddha, who has "thus gone" from samsara into nirvana, and "thus come" from nirvana into samsara to work for the salvation of all sentient beings.
 garbha, "womb", "embryo", "center", "essence".

Asian translations
The Chinese translated the term tathāgatagarbha as rúláizàng (如来藏), or "Tathāgata's (rúlái) storehouse" (zàng). According to Brown, "storehouse" may indicate both "that which enfolds or contains something", or "that which is itself enfolded, hidden or contained by another." The Tibetan translation is de bzhin gshegs pa'i snying po, which cannot be translated as "womb" (mngal or lhums), but as "embryonic essence", "kernel" or "heart". The term "heart" was also used by Mongolian translators.

The Tibetan scholar Go Lotsawa outlined four meanings of the term Tathāgatagarbha as used by Indian Buddhist scholars generally: (1) As an emptiness that is a nonimplicative negation, (2) the luminous nature of the mind, (3) alaya-vijñana (store-consciousness), (4) all bodhisattvas and sentient beings.

Western translations
The term tathagatagarbha first appears in the Tathāgatagarbha sūtras, which date to the 2nd and third centuries CE. It is translated and interpreted in various ways by western translators and scholars:
 According to Sally King, the term tathāgatagarbha may be understood in two ways:
 "embryonic tathāgata", the incipient Buddha, the cause of the Tathāgata,
 "womb of the tathāgata", the fruit of Tathāgata. 
According to King, the Chinese rúláizàng was taken in its meaning as "womb" or "fruit". 
 Wayman & Hideko also point out that the Chinese regularly takes garbha as "womb", but prefer to use the term "embryo".
 According to Brown, following Wayman & Hideko, "embryo" is the best fitting translation, since it preserves "the dynamic, self-transformative nature of the tathagatagarbha."
 According to Zimmermann, garbha may also mean the interior or center of something, and its essence or central part. As a tatpuruṣa it may refer to a person being a "womb" for or "container" of the tathagata. As a bahuvrihi it may refer to a person as having an embryonic tathagata inside. In both cases, this embryonic tathagata still has to be developed. Zimmermann concludes that tathagatagarbha is a bahuvrihi, meaning "containing a tathagata", but notes the variety of meanings of garbha, such as "containing", "born from", "embryo", "(embracing/concealing) womb", "calyx", "child", "member of a clan", "core", which may all be brought into mind when the term tathagatagarbha is being used.
 In addition to Zimmerman's statement that tathagatagarbha most natural means "containing a Tathagata," Paul Williams notes that garbha also means "womb/matrix" and "seed/embryo," and "the innermost part of something." The term tathagatagarbha can thus also imply "that sentient beings have a tathāgata within them in seed or embryo, that sentient beings are the wombs or matrices of the tathāgata, or that they have a tathāgata as their essence, core, or essential inner nature."  According to Williams, the term tathāgatagarbha "may also have been intended simply to answer the question how it is possible that all sentient beings can attain the state of a Buddha.

Buddhadhātu
The term "buddha-nature" is closely related in meaning to the term tathāgatagarbha, but is not an exact translation of this term. It refers to what is essential in the human being.

The corresponding Sanskrit term is buddhadhātu. It has two meanings, namely the nature of the Buddha, equivalent to the term dharmakāya, and the cause of the Buddha. The link between the cause and the result is the nature (dhātu) which is common to both, namely the dharmadhātu.

Matsumoto Shirō also points out that "buddha-nature" translates the Sanskrit-term buddhadhātu, a "place to put something," a "foundation," a "locus." According to Shirō, it does not mean "original nature" or "essence," nor does it mean the "possibility of the attainment of Buddhahood," "the original nature of the Buddha," or "the essence of the Buddha."

In the Vajrayana, the term for buddha-nature is sugatagarbha.

Indian Sutra sources

Earliest sources
According to Wayman, the idea of the tathagatagarbha is grounded on sayings by the Buddha that there is something called the luminous mind (prabhasvara citta), "which is only adventitiously covered over by defilements (agantukaklesa)" The luminous mind is mentioned in a passage from the Anguttara Nikaya: "Luminous, monks, is the mind. And it is defiled by incoming defilements." The Mahāsāṃghika school coupled this idea of the luminous mind with the idea of the mulavijnana, the substratum consciousness that serves as the basis consciousness.

From the idea of the luminous mind emerged the idea that the awakened mind is the pure (visuddhi), undefiled mind. In the tathagatagarbha-sutras it is this pure consciousness that is regarded to be the seed from which Buddhahood grows:

Karl Brunnholzl writes that the first probable mention of the term is in the Ekottarika Agama (though here it is used in a different way than in later texts). The passage states:

This tathāgatagarbha idea was the result of an interplay between various strands of Buddhist thought, on the nature of human consciousness and the means of awakening. Gregory comments on this origin of the Tathagatagarba-doctrine: "The implication of this doctrine [...] is that enlightenment is the natural and true state of the mind."

Avatamsaka Sutra
According to Wayman, the Avataṃsaka Sūtra (1st-3rd century CE) was the next step in the development of the buddha-nature thought after the concept of the luminous mind:

The Avataṃsaka Sūtra does not contain a "singular discussion of the concept", but the idea of "a universal penetration of sentient beings by the wisdom of the Buddha (buddhajñāna)" was complementary to the concept of the Buddha-womb. The basic idea of the Avataṃsaka Sūtra  is the unity of the absolute and the relative:

All levels of reality are related and interpenetrated. This is depicted in the image of Indra's net. This "unity in totality allows every individual entity of the phenomenal world its uniqueness without attributing an inherent nature to anything".

Saddharma Puṇḍarīka Sūtra 
The Lotus Sutra (Skt: Saddharma Puṇḍarīka Sūtra), written between 100 BCE and 200 CE, does not use the term buddha-nature, but Japanese scholars of Buddhism suggest that the idea is nevertheless expressed or implied in the text. In the sixth century Lotus Sutra commentaries began to argue that the text teaches the concept of buddha-nature and, according to Stephen F. Teiser and Jacqueline Stone, "the Lotus Sutra came to be widely understood as teaching the universality of the buddha-nature."
The sutra shares other themes and ideas with the later tathāgatagarbha sūtras like the tathāgatagarbha sūtra and several scholars theorize that it was an influence on these texts.

The tenth chapter emphasizes, in accordance with the Bodhisattva-ideal of the Mahayana teachings, that everyone can be liberated. All living beings can become a buddha, not only monks and nuns, but also laypeople, śrāvakas, bodhisattvas, and non-human creatures. It also details that all living beings can be a 'teacher of the Dharma'.

The twelfth chapter of the Lotus Sutra details that the potential to become enlightened is universal among all people, even the historical Devadatta has the potential to become a buddha. The story of Devadatta is followed by another story about a dragon princess who is both a nāga and a female, whom the bodhisattva Mañjuśrī proclaims will reach enlightenment immediately, in her present form.

Tathāgatagarbha Sūtras

There are several major Indian texts which discuss the idea of buddha-nature and they are often termed the tathāgatagarbha sūtras. According to Brunnholzl "the earliest mahayana sutras that are based on and discuss the notion of tathagatagarbha as the buddha potential that is innate in all sentient beings began to appear in written form in the late second and early third century." Their ideas became very influential in East Asian Buddhism and Tibetan Buddhism. The Tathāgatagarbha sūtras include the Tathāgatagarbha sūtra, Anunatva-Apurnatva-Nirdesa, Śrīmālādevī Siṃhanāda Sūtra, Mahāyāna Mahāparinirvāṇa Sūtra, and the Aṅgulimālīya Sūtra.

Tathāgatagarbha Sūtra
The Tathāgatagarbha Sūtra (200-250 CE) is considered (...) "the earliest expression of this (the tathāgatagarbha doctrine) and the term tathāgatagarbha itself seems to have been coined in this very sutra." It states that all beings already have perfect Buddha body (*tathāgatatva, *buddhatva, *tathāgatakāya) within themselves, but do not recognize it because it is covered over by afflictions.

The Tathāgatagarbha Sūtra uses nine similes to illustrate the concept:

Another one of these texts, the Ghanavyuha Sutra (as quoted by Longchenpa) states that the tathāgatagarbha is the ground of all things:

Śrīmālādevī Siṃhanāda Sūtra
The Śrīmālādevī Siṃhanāda Sūtra (3rd century CE), also named The Lion's Roar of Queen Srimala, centers on the teaching of the tathāgatagarbha as "ultimate soteriological principle". Regarding the tathāgatagarbha, it states:

In the Śrīmālādevī Siṃhanāda Sūtra there are two possible states for the tathāgatagarbha:

The sutra itself states it this way:

Aṅgulimālīya Sūtra 
According to the Aṅgulimālīya Sūtra (2nd c. CE), tathāgatagarbha has the following fundamental natures:

 Neither arising nor ceasing - tathāgatagarbha permanently exists in the world, never arises, and therefore is never destroyed or perished.
 Independence - tathāgatagarbha possesses the intrinsic nature of independently existing without relying on other dharmas. Therefore, all worldly phenomena of aggregates, sense-fields, and elements have the nature of arising and ceasing but tathagatagarbha possesses the intrinsic nature of independence. In addition to tathagatagarbha itself, the intrinsic natures of tathagatagarbha also originally exist without increasing and decreasing and do not change owing to the variance of any conditions.
 Non-perceptiveness - tathāgatagarbha is not the perceptive mind; it does not have the perceptual functions of seeing, hearing, feeling, and knowing regarding the six external sense-objects which the perceptive mind has and therefore does not have the nature to discriminate goodness or badness either.
 Invariability - the tathāgatagarbha and its fundamental natures have the quality of permanence, eternity, imperishability, or diamond (vajra) nature. These are sustained everlastingly and do not change according to the variance of time and space. The Aṅgulimālīya states: "Permanence is the Buddha-nature," "Eternity is the Buddha-nature," "Invariability is the Buddha-nature," "Non-badness is the Buddha-nature," "Non-damage is the Buddha-nature," "No sickness is the Buddha-nature," "Non-aging is the Buddha-nature,"
 Storability - tathāgatagarbha stores a sentient being's seeds of all phenomena, including the seeds of good, bad, and neutral karmas.

Mahāyāna Mahāparinirvāṇa Sūtra

The early buddha-nature concept as expressed in the seminal 'tathagatagarbha sutra' named the Nirvana Sutra is, according to Kevin Trainor, as follows:

The Mahāyāna Mahāparinirvāṇa Sūtra (written 2nd century CE) was very influential in the Chinese reception of the Buddhist teachings. The Mahāyāna Mahāparinirvāṇa Sūtra linked the concept of tathāgatagarbha with the buddhadhātu. Kosho Yamamoto points out that the Nirvana Sutra contains a series of equations: "Thus, there comes about the equation of: Buddha Body = Dharmakaya = eternal body = eternal Buddha = Eternity." According to Shimoda Masahiro, the authors of the Mahāparinirvāṇa Sūtra were  leaders and advocates of stupa worship. The term buddhadhātu originally referred to relics. In the Mahāparinirvāṇa Sūtra, it came to be used in place of the concept of tathāgatagārbha. The authors used the teachings of the Tathāgatagarbha Sūtra to reshape the worship of the physical relics of the Buddha into worship of the inner Buddha as a principle of salvation. Sasaki, in a review of Shimoda, conveys a key premise of Shimoda's work, namely, that the origins of Mahayana Buddhism and the Nirvana Sutra are entwined.

The buddha-nature is always present, in all times and in all beings. This does not mean that sentient beings are at present endowed with the qualities of a Buddha, but that they will have those qualities in the future. It is obscured from worldly vision by the screening effect of tenacious negative mental afflictions within each being. Once these negative mental states have been eliminated, however, the Buddha-dhatu is said to shine forth unimpededly and the Buddha-sphere (Buddha-dhatu/ visaya) can then be consciously "entered into", and therewith deathless Nirvana attained:

According to Sallie B. King, it does not represent a major innovation, and is rather unsystematic, which made it "a fruitful one for later students and commentators, who were obliged to create their own order and bring it to the text". According to King, its most important innovation is the linking of the term buddhadhatu with tathagatagarbha. The sutra presents the buddha-nature or tathagatagarbha as a "Self". The Mahāparinirvāṇa Sūtra refers to a true self.  "The Mahāyāna Mahāparinirvāṅa Sūtra, especially influential in East Asian Buddhist thought, goes so far as to speak of it as our true self (ātman). Its precise metaphysical and ontological status is, however, open to interpretation in the terms of different Mahāyāna philosophical schools; for the Madhyamikas it must be empty of its own existence like everything else; for the Yogacarins, following the Laṅkāvatāra, it can be identified with store consciousness, as the receptacle of the seeds of awakening.  Paul Williams states: "[...] it is obvious that the Mahaparinirvana Sutra does not consider it impossible for a Buddhist to affirm an atman provided it is clear what the correct understanding of this concept is, and indeed the sutra clearly sees certain advantages in doing so." but it speaks about buddha-nature in so many different ways, that Chinese scholars created a list of types of buddha-nature that could be found in the text. Paul Williams also notes:

Williams further explains that, while speaking of a Self, the Mahāparinirvāṇa Sūtra does not determine this further than that which "enables sentient beings to become Buddhas."

Laṅkāvatāra Sūtra
The Laṅkāvatāra Sūtra (compiled 350-400 CE) synthesized the tathagatagarba-doctrine and the ālāya-vijñāna doctrine. The Lankavatara Sutra "assimilates Tathagata-garbha thought to the Yogacara-viewpoint, and this assimilation is further developed in [...] The Treatise on the Awakening of Faith in the Mahayana". According to the Lankavatara Sutra tathāgatagarbha is identical to the ālaya-vijñāna, known prior to awakening as the storehouse-consciousness or 8th consciousness. The ālāya-vijñāna is supposed to contain the pure seed, or tathagatagarbha, from which awakening arises.

The Lankavatara-sutra contains tathagata-garba thought, but also warns against reification of the idea of buddha-nature, and presents it as an aid to attaining awakening:

According to Alex and Hideko Wayman, the equation of tathagatagarbha and ālāya-vijñāna is innovative:

Indian commentaries
The tathāgatagarbha doctrine was also widely discussed by Indian Mahayana scholars in treatises or commentaries, called śāstra, the most influential of which was the Ratnagotravibhāga (5th century CE).

Ratnagotravibhāga
The Ratnagotravibhāga, also called Uttaratantraśāstra (5th century CE), is an Indian śāstra in which synthesised major elements and themes of the tathāgatagārbha theory. It gives an overview of authoritative tathāgatagarbha sutras, mentioning the Tathāgatagarbha Sūtra, the Śrīmālādevī Siṃhanāda Sūtra, Mahāparinirvāṇa Sūtra, the Aṅgulimālīya Sūtra, the Anunatva-Apurnatva-Nirdesa and the Mahābherīharaka-sūtra. It presents the tathāgatagarbha as "an ultimate, unconditional reality that is simultaneously the inherent, dynamic process towards its complete manifestation". Mundane and enlightened reality are seen as complementary:

In the Ratnagotravibhāga, the tathāgatagarbha is seen as having three specific characteristics: (1) dharmakaya, (2) suchness, and (3) disposition, as well as the general characteristic (4) non-conceptuality.

According to the Ratnagotravibhāga, all sentient beings have "the embryo of the Tathagata" in three senses:
 the Tathāgata's dharmakāya permeates all sentient beings;
 the Tathāgata's tathatā is omnipresent (avyatibheda);
 the Tathāgata's species (gotra, a synonym for tathagatagarbha) occurs in them.

The Ratnagotravibhāga equates enlightenment with the nirvāṇa-realm and the dharmakāya. It gives a variety of synonyms for garbha, the most frequently used being gotra and dhatu.

This text also explains the tathāgatagarbha in terms of luminous mind: "The luminous nature of the mind Is unchanging, just like space."

Other possible Indian treatises on buddha-nature 
Takasaki Jikido notes various buddha nature treatises which exist only in Chinese and which are similar in some ways to the Ratnagotra. These works are unknown in other textual traditions and scholars disagree on whether they are translations, original compositions or a mixture of the two. These works are:

 Dharmadhātvaviśeṣaśāstra (Dasheng fajie wuchabie lun 大乘法界無差別論), said to have been translated by Paramartha and attributed to Saramati (the same author which the Chinese tradition states wrote the Ratnagotra).
 Buddhagotraśāstra (佛性論, Fó xìng lùn, Buddha-nature treatise, Taishō 1610), said to have been translated by Paramartha and is attributed by Chinese tradition to Vasubandhu
 Anuttarâśrayasūtra, which according to Takasaki "is clearly a composition based upon the Ratna."

Madhyamaka school 
Indian Madhyamak a phi"losophers interpreted the theory as a description of emptiness and as a non implicative negation. Bhaviveka's Tarkajvala states:

Candrakirti's Madhyamakāvatārabhāsya states: "One should know that since [the alaya-consciousness] follows the nature of all entities, it is nothing but emptiness that is taught through the term 'alaya-consciousness.'"

Go Lotsawa states that this statement is referencing the tathāgatagarbha doctrine. Candrakirti's Madhyamakāvatārabhāsya also argues, basing itself on the Lankavatara sutra, that "the statement of the emptiness of sentient beings being a buddha adorned with all major and minor marks is of expedient meaning".

Kamalasila's (c. 740-795) Madhyamakaloka associates tathāgatagarbha with luminosity and luminosity with emptiness:

Uniquely among Madhyamaka texts, some texts attributed to Nagarjuna, mainly poetic works like the Dharmadhatustava, Cittavajrastava, and Bodhicittavivarana associate the term tathāgatagarbha with the luminous nature of the mind.

Yogacara scholars

According to Brunnholzl, "all early Indian Yogacara masters (such as Asanga, Vasubandhu, Sthiramati, and Asvabhava), if they refer to the term tathāgatagarbha at all, always explain it as nothing but suchness in the sense of twofold identitylessness".

Some later Yogacara scholars spoke of the tathāgatagarbha in more positive terms, such as Jñanasrimitra who in his Sakarasiddhi equates it with the appearances of lucidity (prakasarupa). Likewise, Brunnholzl notes that "Ratnakarasanti generally describes the tathagata heart as being equivalent to naturally luminous mind, nondual self-awareness, and the perfect nature (which he considers to be an implicative negation and not a nonimplicative negation)."

Alaya-vijñana 
The Yogacara concept of the alaya-vijñana (store consciousness) also came to be associated by some scholars with the tathāgatagarbha. This can be seen in sutras like the Lankavatara, the Srimaladevi and in the translations of Paramartha. The concept of the ālaya-vijñāna originally meant defiled consciousness: defiled by the workings of the five senses and the mind. It was also seen as the mūla-vijñāna, the base-consciousness or "stream of consciousness" from which awareness and perception spring.

To account for the notion of buddha-nature in all beings, with the Yogacara belief in the Five Categories of Beings, Yogacara scholars in China such as Tz'u-en (慈恩, 632-682) the first patriarch in China, advocated two types of nature: the latent nature found in all beings (理佛性) and the buddha-nature in practice (行佛性). The latter nature was determined by the innate seeds in the alaya.

Trikaya doctrine
Around 300 CE, the Yogacara school systematized the prevalent ideas on the nature of the Buddha in the Trikaya or three-body doctrine. According to this doctrine, Buddhahood has three aspects:
 The Nirmana-kaya, or Transformation-body, the earthly manifestation of the Buddha;
 The Sambhogakāya, or Enjoyment-body, a subtle body, by which the Buddha appears to bodhisattvas to teach them;
 The Dharmakāya, or Dharma-body, the ultimate nature of the Buddha, and the ultimate nature of reality.

They may be described as follows:

Chinese Buddhism
The tathāgatagarbha idea was extremely influential in the development of East Asian Buddhism. When Buddhism was introduced to China, in the 1st century CE, Buddhism was understood through comparisons of its teachings to Chinese terms and ways of thinking. Chinese Buddhist thinkers like Zhi Mindu, Zhidun, and Huiyuan (d. 433) interpreted Buddhist concepts in terms of the Chinese neo-daoist philosophy called 'dark learning' (xuanxue). This tendency was only later countered by the work of Chinese Madhyamaka scholar-translators like Kumarajiva.

The buddha nature idea was introduced into China with the translation of the Mahaparanirvana sutra in the early fifth century and this text became the central source of buddha-nature doctrine in Chinese Buddhism. Based on their understanding of the Mahayana Mahaparinirvana Sutra some Chinese Buddhists supposed that the teaching of the buddha-nature was, as stated by that sutra, the final Buddhist teaching, and that there is an essential truth above sunyata and the two truths. This idea was interpreted as being similar to the ideas of Dao and Principle (Li) in Chinese philosophy.

Awakening of Faith in the Mahāyāna
Awakening of Faith in the Mahayana was very influential in the development of Chinese Buddhism  said to have been translated by Paramartha (499-569). While the text is traditionally attributed to Aśvaghoṣa, no Sanskrit version of the text is extant. The earliest known versions are written in Chinese, and contemporary scholars believe that the text is a Chinese composition.

Awakening of Faith in the Mahayana offers a synthesis of Chinese buddhist thinking. It sees the buddha-nature doctrine as a cosmological theory, in contrast to the Indo-Tibetan tradition, where the soteriological aspect is emphasized. It described the "One Mind" which "includes in itself all states of being of the phenomenal and transcendental world". It tried to harmonize the ideas of the tathāgatagarbha and ālāya-vijñāna:

In Awakening of Faith the 'one mind' has two aspects, namely tathata, suchness, the things as they are, and samsara, the cycle of birth and death. This text was in line with an essay by Emperor Wu of the Liang dynasty (reign 502-549 CE), in which he postulated a pure essence, the enlightened mind, trapped in darkness, which is ignorance. By this ignorance the pure mind is trapped in samsara. This resembles the tathāgatagarba and the idea of the defilement of the luminous mind. In a commentary on this essay Shen Yue stated that insight into this true essence is awakened by stopping the thoughts - a point of view which is also being found in the Platform Sutra of Huineng.

The joining together of these different ideas supported the notion of the ekayāna, the one vehicle: absolute oneness, all-pervading Buddha-wisdom and original enlightenment as a holistic whole. This synthesis was a reflection of the unity which was attained in China with the united Song dynasty.

In Chinese Yogacara and Madhyamaka 
By the 6th century CE buddha nature had been well established in Chinese Buddhism and a wide variety of theories developed to explain it. One influential figure who wrote about buddha nature was Ching-ying Hui-yuan (523-592 CE), a Chinese Yogacarin who argued for a kind of idealism which held that: "All dharmas without exception originate and are formed from the true[-mind], and other than the true[-mind], there exists absolutely nothing which can give rise to false thoughts."

Ching-ying Hui-yuan equated this 'true mind' with the alaya-vijñana, the tathāgatagarbha and "Buddha-nature" (fóxìng) and held that it was an essence, a true consciousness and a metaphysical principle that ensured that all sentient beings will reach enlightenment. According to Ming-Wood Liu "Hui-yuan's interpretation of the buddha-nature doctrine represents the culmination of a long process of transformation of the "Buddha-nature" from a basically practical to an ontological concept."

The Chinese Yogacara school was also split on the relationship between the tathāgatagarbha and ālayavijñāna. Fa-shang (495-580), representing the southern Yogacara, asserted that they were separate, that the alaya was illusiory and impure while buddha-nature was the ultimate source of all phenomenal reality. In the northern school meanwhile, it was held that the alaya and buddha-nature were the same pure support for all phenomena. In the sixth and seventh centuries, the Yogacara theory became associated with a substantialist non-dual metaphysics which saw buddha nature as an eternal ground. This idea was promoted by figures like Fazang and Ratnamati.

In contrast with the Chinese Yogacara view, the Chinese Madhyamaka scholar Jizang (549–623 CE) sought to remove all ontological connotations of the term as a metaphysical reality and saw buddha nature as being synonymous with terms like "tathata," "dharmadhatu," "ekayana," "wisdom, '' "ultimate reality," "middle way" and also the wisdom that contemplates dependent origination. In formulating his view, Jizang was influenced by the earlier Chinese Madhyamaka thinker Sengzhao (384–414 CE) who was a key figure in outlining an understanding of emptiness which was based on the Indian sources and not on Daoist concepts which previous Chinese Buddhists had used. Jizang used the compound "Middle Way-buddha-nature" (zhongdao foxing 中道佛 性) to refer to his view. Jizang was also one of the first Chinese philosophers to famously argue that plants and insentient objects have buddha-nature, which he also termed true reality and universal principle (dao).

In the 20th century, the influential Chinese master Yin Shun drew on Chinese Madhyamaka to argue against any Yogacara influenced view that buddha-nature was an underlying permanent ground of reality and instead supported the view that buddha-nature teachings are just an expedient means. Yin Shun, drawing on his study of Indian Madhyamaka promoted the emptiness of all things as the ultimate Buddhist truth, and argued that the buddha-nature teaching was a provisional teaching taught in order to ease the fear of some Buddhists regarding emptiness as well as to attract those people who have an affinity to the idea of a Self or Brahman. Later after taking up the Buddhist path, they would be introduced to the truth of emptiness.

In Tiantai 
In the Tiantai school, the primary figure is the scholar Zhiyi. According to Paul L. Swanson, none of Zhiyi's works discuss buddha- nature explicitly at length however. Yet it is still an important concept in his philosophy, which is seen as synonymous with the ekayana principle outlined in the Lotus Sutra. Swanson argues that for Zhiyi, buddha-nature is:

Buddha-nature for Zhiyi therefore has three aspects which he bases on passages from the Lotus sutra and the Nirvana sutra:

 The direct cause of attaining Buddhahood, the innate potential in all sentient beings to become Buddhas, which is the aspect of 'true nature', the way things are.
 The complete cause of attaining Buddhahood, which is the aspect of wisdom that illuminates the true nature and the goal of practice.
 The conditional causes of attaining Buddhahood, which is the aspect of the practices and activities that lead to Buddhahood.

The later Tiantai scholar Zhanran would expand the Tiantai view of buddha-nature, which he saw as synonymous with suchness, to argue for the idea that insentient rocks and plants also have buddha-nature.

In Chan Buddhism
In Chan Buddhism, buddha-nature tends to be seen as the (non-substantial) essential nature of all beings. But the Zen tradition also emphasizes that buddha-nature is śūnyatā, the absence of an independent and substantial "self". In the East Mountain Teaching of early Chan, buddha-nature was equated with the nature of mind, while later on any identification with a reificationable term or object was rejected. This is reflected in the recorded sayings of Chan master Mazu Daoyi (709–788), who first stated that "Mind is Buddha," but later stated "Neither mind nor Buddha."

Chan masters from Huineng (7th-century China), Chinul (12th century Korea), Hakuin Ekaku (18th-century Japan) to Hsu Yun (20th-century China), have taught that the process of awakening begins with the light of the mind turning around to recognize its own true nature, so that the 8th consciousness, ālayavijñāna, also known as the tathāgatagarbha, is transformed into the "bright mirror wisdom". According to D.T. Suzuki, the Laṅkāvatāra Sūtra presents the Chan/Zen Buddhist view of the tathāgatagarbha:

When this active transformation is complete, the other seven consciousnesses are also transformed. The 7th consciousness of delusive discrimination becomes transformed into the "equality wisdom". The 6th consciousness of thinking sense becomes transformed into the "profound observing wisdom", and the 1st to 5th consciousnesses of the five sensory senses become transformed into the "all-performing wisdom".

The influential Chan patriarch Guifeng Zongmi (780–841) interpreted buddha-nature as "empty tranquil awareness" (k'ung-chi chih), which he took from the Ho-tse school of Chan. Following the Srimala sutra, he interpreted the theory of emptiness as presented in the Prajñaparamita sutras as provisional and saw buddha-nature as the definitive teaching of Buddhism.

According to Heng-Ching Shih, the teaching of the universal buddha-nature does not intend to assert the existence of substantial, entity-like self endowed with excellent features of a Buddha. Rather, buddha-nature simply represents the potentiality to be realized in the future.

Hsing Yun, forty-eighth patriarch of the Linji school, equates the buddha-nature with the dharmakāya in line with pronouncements in key tathāgatagarbha sūtras. He defines these two as:

Korean Buddhism
In the Korean Vajrasamādhi Sūtra (685 CE), the tathāgatagarbha is presented as being possessed of two elements, one essential, immutable, changeless and still, the other active and salvational:

Shin Buddhism
The founder of the Jōdo Shinshū of Pure Land Buddhism, Shinran, equated buddha-Nature with shinjin.

Tibetan Buddhism

In Tibetan Buddhist scholastics, there are two main camps of interpreting buddha-nature. There are those who argue that tathāgatagarbha is just emptiness (described either as dharmadhatu, the nature of phenomena, or a nonimplicative negation) and there are those who see it as the union of the mind's emptiness and luminosity (which includes the buddha qualities).

The Gelug school of Tibetan Buddhism favors what is called the rangtong interpretation of Prasaṅgika Madhyamaka philosophy. They thus interpret buddha-nature as an expedient term for the emptiness of inherent existence. Other schools, especially the Jonang, and Kagyu have tended to accept the shentong, "other-empty", Madhyamaka philosophy, which discerns an Absolute which "is empty of adventitious defilements which are intrinsically other than it, but is not empty of its own inherent existence".

These interpretations of the tathagatagarbha-teachings has been a matter of intensive debates in Tibet.

Nyingma
In the Nyingma school doctrines on buddha-nature are generally marked by the tendency to align the idea with Dzogchen views as well as with Prasangika Madhyamaka, beginning with the work of Rongzom (1042–1136) and continuing into the work of Longchenpa (1308–1364) and Mipham (1846–1912). Mipham Rinpoche, the most authoritative figure in modern Nyingma, adopted a view of buddha-nature as the unity of appearance and emptiness, relating it to the descriptions of the Ground in Dzogchen as outlined by Longchenpa. This ground is said to be primordially pure (ka dag) and spontaneously present (Ihun grub).

Germano writes that Dzogchen "represents the most sophisticated interpretation of the so-called "Buddha nature" tradition within the context of Indo-Tibetan thought".

The 19th/20th-century Nyingma scholar, Shechen Gyaltsap Gyurme Pema Namgyal, sees the buddha-nature as ultimate truth, nirvana, which is constituted of profundity, primordial peace and radiance:

Tulku Urgyen Rinpoche sees an identity between the buddha-nature, dharmadhātu (essence of all phenomena and the noumenon) and the Three Vajras, saying:

The Nyingma meditation masters, Khenchen Palden Sherab and Khenpo Tsewang Dongyal, emphasise that the essential nature of the mind (the buddha-nature) is not a blankness, but is characterized by wonderful qualities and a non-conceptual perfection that is already present and complete, it's just obscured and we fail to recognize it.

Speaking in the context of Nyingma, Dzogchen Ponlop expresses the view that there exists within vajrayana Buddhism the doctrine that we are already buddha: '... in the vajrayana, we are buddha right now, in this very moment' and that it is legitimate to have 'vajra pride' in our buddha mind and the already present qualities of enlightenment with which it is replete:

Kagyu
According to Brunnholzl,

In Kagyu the view of the Third Karmapa is generally seen as the most authoritative. This is the view that buddha-nature is "mind's luminous ultimate nature or nondual wisdom, which is the basis of everything in samsara and nirvana." Thrangu Rinpoche sees the Buddha-nature as the indivisible oneness of wisdom and emptiness:

Sakya 
Sakya Pandita (1182–1251) sees the buddha-nature as the dharmadhatu free from all reference points, and states that the teaching that buddha-nature exists in all beings is of expedient meaning and that its basis is emptiness, citing Candrakirti's Madhyamakāvatārabhāsya. The Sakya scholar Rongtön meanwhile, argued that buddha-nature is suchness, with stains, or emptiness of the mind with stains.

Sakya scholar Buton Rinchen Drub (1290–1364), like the Gelugpas, held that the buddha-nature teachings were of expedient meaning and that the naturally abiding disposition is nothing but emptiness, however unlike them, his view was that the basis for these teachings is the alaya-vijñana and also that buddha-nature is the dharmakaya of a buddha but "never exists in the great mass of sentient beings".

According to Brunnholzl, in the works of the influential Sakya scholar Gorampa Sonam Senge (1429–1489), buddha-nature is

Sakya Chokden meanwhile argues that the ultimate buddha-nature is "minds natural luminosity free from all extremes of reference points, which is the sphere of personally experienced wisdom and an implicative negation."

Jonang
The Jonang school, whose foremost historical figure was the Tibetan scholar-monk Dolpopa Sherab Gyaltsen (1292–1361), sees the buddha-nature as the very ground of the Buddha himself, as the "permanent indwelling of the Buddha in the basal state". According to Brunnholzl, Dolpopa, basing himself on certain tathāgatagarbha sutras, argued that the buddha-nature is "ultimately really established, everlasting, eternal, permanent, immutable (therzug), and being beyond dependent origination." This is the foundation of what is called the Shentong view.

The Buddhist tantric scripture entitled Chanting the Names of Mañjuśrī, repeatedly exalts, as portrayed by Dolpopa, not the non-Self but the Self, and applies the following terms to this ultimate reality : 'The Buddha-Self, the beginningless Self, the solid Self, the diamond Self'. These terms are applied in a manner which reflects the cataphatic approach to Buddhism, typical of much of Dolpopa's writings.

Cyrus Stearns writes that Dolpopa's attitude to the 'third turning of the wheel' doctrines (i.e. the buddha-nature teachings) is that they "are the final definitive statements on the nature of ultimate reality, the primordial ground or substratum beyond the chain of dependent origination, and which is only empty of other, relative phenomena."

Gelug
An early Tibetan translator, Ngok Lotsawa (1050–1109) argues in his commentary to the Uttaratantra that buddha-nature is a non-implicative negation, which is to say that it is emptiness, as a total negation of inherent existence (svabhava) that does not imply that anything is left un-negated (in terms of its svabhava). Another early figure, Chaba Chokyi Senge also argued that buddha-nature was a non-implicative negation. The Kadampa tradition generally followed Ngok Lotsawa by holding that Buddha- nature was a nonimplicative negation. The Gelug school, which sees itself as a continuation of the Kadampas, also hold this view, while also holding, as Chaba did, that buddha-nature teachings are of expedient meaning.

Kedrub Jé Geleg Balsang (1385–1438), one of the main disciples of Tsongkhapa, defined the tathāgatagarbha thus:

Brunnholzl states that the view of Gyaltsab Darma Rinchen (1364–1432) is "that the tathàgata heart is the state of a being in whom mind's emptiness is obscured, while buddhas by definition do not possess this tathàgata heart."

The 14th Dalai Lama sees the buddha-nature as the "original clear light of mind", but points out that it ultimately does not exist independently, because, like all other phenomena, it is of the nature of emptiness:

Rimé movement
The Rimé movement is an ecumenical movement in Tibet which started as an attempt to reconcile the various Tibetan schools in the 19th century. In contrast to the Gelugpa, which adheres to the rang stong, "self-empty", or Prasaṅgika point of view, the Rimé movement supports shen tong (gzhan tong), "other-empty", an essential nature which is "pure radiant non-dual consciousness". Jamgon Kongtrul says about the two systems:

Modern scholarship
Modern scholarship points to the various possible interpretations of buddha-nature as either an essential self, as Sunyata, or as the inherent possibility of awakening.

Essential self
Shenpen Hookham, Oxford Buddhist scholar and Tibetan lama of the Shentong tradition writes of the buddha-nature or "true self" as something real and permanent, and already present within the being as uncompounded enlightenment. She calls it "the Buddha within", and comments:

Buddhist scholar and chronicler, Merv Fowler, writes that the buddha-nature really is present as an essence within each being. Fowler comments:

Sunyata
According to Heng-Ching Shih, the tathāgatagarbha/buddha-nature does not represent a substantial self (ātman). Rather, it is a positive language expression of emptiness (śūnyatā), which emphasizes the potentiality to realize Buddhahood through Buddhist practices. The intention of the teaching of tathāgatagarbha/buddha-nature is soteriological rather than theoretical.

Paul Williams puts forward the Madhyamaka interpretation of the buddha-nature as emptiness in the following terms:

Critical Buddhist interpretation
Several contemporary Japanese Buddhist scholars, headed under the label Critical Buddhism (hihan bukkyō, 批判仏教), have been critical of buddha-nature thought. According to Matsumoto Shirõ and Hakamaya Noriaki of Komazawa University, essentialist conceptions of buddha-nature are at odds with the fundamental Buddhist doctrine of dependent origination and non-self (anātman). The Buddha nature doctrines which they label as dhātuvāda ("substantialism,"sometimes rendered "locus theory" or "topicalism") and "generative monism" is not Buddhism at all. As defined by Matsumoto, this "locus" theory or dhātuvāda which he rejects as un-buddhist is: "It is the theory that the single (eka, sama) existent "locus" (dhatu) or basis is the cause that produces the manifold phenomena or "super-loci" (dharmah)." Matsumoto further argues that: "Tathagatagarbha thought was a Buddhist version of Hindu monism, formed by the influence of Hinduism gradually introduced into Buddhism, especially after the rise of Mahayana Buddhism." Other Japanese scholars responded to this view leading to a lively debate in Japan. Takasaki Jikido, a well known authority on tathagathagarbha thought, accepted that Buddha nature theories are similar to Upanishadic theories and that dhātuvāda is an accurate expression of the structure of these doctrines, but argues that the Buddha nature texts are aware of this and that Buddha nature is not necessarily un-Buddhist or anti-Buddhist. Likewise, Hirakawa Akira, sees buddha-nature as the potential to attain Buddhahood which is not static but ever changing and argues that "dhātu" does not necessarily mean substratum (he points to some Agamas which identify dhatu with pratitya-samutpada).

Western scholars have reacted in different ways to this idea. Sallie B. King objects to their view, seeing the buddha-nature as a metaphor for the potential in all beings to attain Buddhahood, rather than as an ontological reality. Robert H. Sharf notes that the worries of the Critical Buddhists is nothing new, for "the early tathāgatagarbha scriptures betray a similar anxiety, as they tacitly acknowledge that the doctrine is close to, if not identical with, the heretical ātmavāda teachings of the non- Buddhists." He also notes how the Nirvāṇa-sūtra "tacitly concedes the non-Buddhist roots of the tathāgatagarbha idea." Sharf also has pointed out how certain Southern Chan masters were concerned with other interpretations of Buddha nature, showing how the tendency to critique certain views of Buddha nature is not new in East Asian Buddhism.

Peter N. Gregory has also argued that at least some East Asian interpretations of Buddha nature are equivalent to what Critical Buddhists call dhātuvāda, especially the work of Tsung-mi, who "emphasizes the underlying ontological ground on which all phenomenal appearances (hsiang) are based, which he variously refers to as the nature (hsing), the one mind (i-hsin)...". According to Dan Lusthaus, certain Chinese Buddhist ideologies which became dominant in the 8th century promoted the idea of an "underlying metaphysical substratum" or "underlying, invariant, universal metaphysical 'source'" and thus do seem to be a kind of dhātuvāda. According to Lusthaus "in early T'ang China (7th–8th century) there was a deliberate attempt to divorce Chinese Buddhism from developments in India." Lusthaus notes that the Huayen thinker Fa-tsang was influential in this theological trend who promoted the idea that true Buddhism was about comprehending the "One Mind that alone is the ground of reality" (wei- hsin).

Paul Williams too has criticised this view, saying that Critical Buddhism is too narrow in its definition of what constitutes Buddhism. According to Williams, "We should abandon any simplistic identification of Buddhism with a straightforward not-Self definition".

Multiple meanings
Sutton agrees with Williams' critique on the narrowness of any single interpretation. In discussing the inadequacy of modern scholarship on buddha-nature, Sutton states, "One is impressed by the fact that these authors, as a rule, tend to opt for a single meaning disregarding all other possible meanings which are embraced in turn by other texts". He goes on to point out that the term tathāgatagarbha has up to six possible connotations. Of these, he says the three most important are:
an underlying ontological reality or essential nature (tathāgata-tathatā-'vyatireka) which is functionally equivalent to a self (ātman) in an Upanishadic sense,
the dharmakāya which penetrates all beings (sarva-sattveṣu dharma-kāya-parispharaṇa), which is functionally equivalent to brahman in an Upanishadic sense
the womb or matrix of Buddhahood existing in all beings (tathāgata-gotra-saṃbhava), which provides beings with the possibility of awakening.
Of these three, Sutton claims that only the third connotation has any soteriological significance, while the other two posit buddha-nature as an ontological reality and essential nature behind all phenomena.

See also

 Dhammakaya tradition
 Hongaku
 Immanence
 Kulayarāja Tantra
 Panentheism
 Rigpa
 Turiya
 Won Buddhism

Notes

References

Sources

 
 

  

 
 

 
 

 
 
 
 
 

 
 
 

 
  
 
 
 

 

 Powers, J. A. (2000). Concise Encyclopaedia of Buddhism.

 Rawson, Philip (1991).  Sacred Tibet. London, Thames and Hudson.  .
 

 
 
 
 
 
 Suzuki, D.T. (1978). The Lankavatara Sutra, Prajna Press, Boulder.

Further reading
General
 Kalupahana, David J. (1992), A history of Buddhist philosophy. Delhi: Motilal Banarsidass Publishers
 Sallie, B. King: Buddha Nature, State University of New York Press 1991, 
China
 
 
 
Tibet
 Brunnholzl, Karl (2009), Luminous Heart: The Third Karmapa on Consciousness, Wisdom, and Buddha Nature. Snow Lion Publications. 
 
Japan
 
Critical Buddhism

External links
 Thich Hang Dat, The Interpretation of Buddha-nature in Chan Tradition
 On the Buddha-nature of Insentient Things, Robert H. Sharf
 "Nirvana Sutra": full text of "Nirvana Sutra", plus appreciation of its teachings. and Nirvana Sutra (2,6 MB)
 The Laṅkāvatāra Sūtra A Mahāyāna Text
 Hodge, Stephen (2009 & 2012). "The Textual Transmission of the Mahayana Mahaparinirvana-sutra"

 
Buddhist philosophical concepts
Dzogchen
Mahayana
Nondualism
Shentong